Kirti Stambha is a 12th-century tower situated at Chittor Fort in Chittorgarh town of Rajasthan, India.

History 

Chittor has a history going back several centuries. It was an ancient centre of Jain tradition. Chittor is adjacent to the ancient city of Madhyamika. The Jain inscriptions at Mathura from the Kushana period (1st to 3rd centuries) mention a "Majjhimilla" branch of the "Kottiya" gana, indicating that it was a major Jain centre. The famous Acharya Haribhadra Suri (6th century) was born in Chittor and wrote "Dhurtopakhyana" there.

There was a scholar Elacharya at Chittor from whom Vira-senacharya (9th century) learned the ancient Shat-khandagama and Kashayapahuda. Virasena later wrote the famous "Dhavala" and "Jayadhavala" on the basis of these books.

The  tower was built by a Jain merchant Jeeja Bhagerwala during the reign of Rawal Kumar Singh in  CE. It was the residence of Jinavallabha who propagated the Vidhimarga in the 12th century. From the 15th to 17th centuries, it was the seat of a Bhattaraka.

Three inscriptions have been found that mention Jija of Bagherwal community as the builder of the  stambha. One of the inscriptions mention Dharmakirti, the disciple of Shubhakirti, who was disciple of Vasantkirti. According to the Balatkara Gana Pattavali, Dharmakirti headed the patta during 1224-1257 AD. Thus the structure dates from the 13th century, although an unrelated Jain inscription of 896 AD was found in the vicinity. Kirti Stambha is older than another tower in the same fort, known as the Vijay Stambha (Tower of Victory).

Architecture 

The tower is built in the Solanki style. The tower is  Height. The tower is famous  for its for intricate carvings and architecture. The seven storey temple is adorned by sculpture and mouldings from the base to summit. The carvings on each summit is different from other. The tower stands near the Saat-Bees Jain temple.

The lower level is called Hansh Peeth, then Sinha-mukh Thar, Gaja Thar and Nava Thar.

Gallery

See also
 Stambha
 Vijay Stambha
 Manastambha
 Chittor Fort

References

Citations

Sources

Book

Web

External links 

Towers in India
Monuments and memorials in Rajasthan
Chittorgarh Fort
Jain architecture
12th-century Jain temples